Mirando may refer to:

Places
Mirando City, Texas, census-designated place (CDP) in Webb County, Texas, United States

People
Joseph Mirando (1931–2020), French professional racing cyclist
Mirando Mrsić (born 1959), Croatian physician, politician and a Minister of Labour and Pension System
Mirando Rodríguez (boxer) (born 1974), Brazilian boxer

Music
Mirando (song) from the third studio album by Ratatat released in 2008

See also
Mirando de lado, debut studio album by Mexican group Kinky
Maranda (disambiguation)
Meranda
Miranda (disambiguation)
Morondo
Murindó